Phenylmercuric borate is a topical antiseptic and disinfectant that is soluble in water, ethanol and glycerol.

It was used until the 1990s as an active ingredient in disinfectants and in the field of wound treatment for the skin, mouth and throat, for example under the trade name Merfen Orange. However, it has been replaced by other substances due to the high mercury content.

See also
 Phenylmercuric nitrate

References

Antiseptics
Borates
Organomercury compounds
Phenyl compounds